The A5 highway is a highway in Nigeria. It joins the major cities of Lagos and Ibadan. It passes through the city of Abeokuta and is to the west of the more direct route to Ibadan via the A1 highway.

Highways in Nigeria